Amy Molloy is an Irish actress born in Belfast, Northern Ireland. She resides in London UK.

Career 
Molloy's work on screen includes; Animals, Call the Midwife, '71, The Fall and the screen adaptation of John Banville novel The Sea, as well as the Royal Court Theatre film of Cyprus Avenue by David Ireland.

She was nominated for Best Actor in a Female Role at the Richard Harris International Film Festival 2020, for her lead role as Rosie Curran, in the short film Bound. Her performance also earned her a special mention at the Cork International Film Festival in 2019, with Film Ireland remarking that her "powerful performance carries the film".

Molloy plays Holiday Grainger's sister in the 2019 film Animals 2019. Variety described her performance as ‘tamed wild child’ Jean as "excellent" when the film premiered at Sundance Film Festival. The Telegraph also noted her performance in their 4 star review of the film.

Her theatre career includes; work for the Royal Court Theatre London and Public Theater NYC, in the original and shocking dark comedy, Cyprus Avenue, playing opposite actor Stephen Rea, as his daughter Julie. The production was screened on BBC Four in 2019 and via Royal Court Theatre online, in 2020. It was listed in the Top 50 Plays of the 21st Century, by The Guardian.

She recently appeared as Bridget in Translations by Brian Friel at the Royal National Theatre London in 2019, in a production directed by Ian Rickson, with a cast including Ciaran Hinds and Judith Roddy. Her solo performance as Aoife in Cotton Fingers by Rachel Tresize at the Edinburgh Fringe Festival in 2019, won her praise for her performance of a young woman from Belfast having to travel alone to terminate a pregnancy in Wales. She won a Lustrum Award for excellence and the show was listed as one of The Stage ‘Best Shows at the Edinburgh Fringe, 2019’.

Molloy has appeared on stage at the Abbey Theatre Dublin  and the Brooklyn Academy of Music, New York in a revival and new adaptation of Ibsen's John Gabriel Borkman by Frank McGuinness, which starred Alan Rickman, Fiona Shaw and Lindsay Duncan.

Molloy has also played Louise Kendall in the Gate Theatre, Dublin production of My Cousin Rachel, in an original dramatic adaptation by Joseph O’Connor. The production starred Hannah Yelland as Rachel.

In 2015, Molloy's performance in one woman show, Tea Set, at the Edinburgh Festival Fringe Scotland, The Pleasance Courtyard, was one of Lyn Gardner's top ticket picks, describing her performance as "packing a wallop" and "perfectly judged". The Scotsman ranked it as "one of the top rank performances to be seen at the Fringe" that year. Molloy was asked to write an article for the online branch of The Scotsman, on the play and its topics of loneliness, isolation and grief, teaming up with Age Scotland in order to raise awareness for Silverline and other local charities.

Filmography

Television

References

External links 
 
 ‘How Art Can Come From Grief’, first-time fringer, rated by Alan Rickman, performing in TeaSet

Film actresses from Northern Ireland
Stage actresses from Northern Ireland
Living people
Actresses from Belfast
21st-century actresses from Northern Ireland
Year of birth missing (living people)